The Boys from Doraville is the ninth album by the Southern rock band Atlanta Rhythm Section, and their final album on Polydor Records, released in 1980.

The album peaked at #65 on the Billboard 200. None of its singles charted. As a result, the group departed Polydor, which led to a breach of contract lawsuit from the company that was later settled in the band's favor.

Track listing

Personnel
 Barry Bailey – guitar
 J.R. Cobb – guitar, backing vocals
 Dean Daughtry – keyboards
 Roy Yeager – drums, percussion
 Paul Goddard – bass
 Ronnie Hammond – vocals, backing vocals
 "Stray" Straton – backing vocals

Charts
Album

References

External links

Atlanta Rhythm Section albums
1980 albums
Albums produced by Buddy Buie
Polydor Records albums